Riders of the Whistling Skull is a 1937 "Three Mesquiteers" Western B-movie of the weird western genre starring Bob Livingston, Ray "Crash" Corrigan, and ventriloquist Max Terhune with his dummy Elmer. It was directed by Mack V. Wright, produced by Nat Levine and released by Republic Pictures.  The film is based on the 1934 novel by William Colt MacDonald.

Plot
After Professor Marsh disappears while searching for the lost city of Lukachukai, a party of anthropologists including Marsh's daughter Betty arrive in a Western town to prepare an expedition to look for him.  Meanwhile, the Three Mesquiteers have discovered a delirious man wandering the desert and bring him to town where Betty recognizes him as a member of her missing father's expedition.  As the man slowly gets his memory back the party wishes to know the location of Professor Marsh and Lukachukai that contains an ancient legendary treasure.  The man is murdered with a knife bearing an Indian inscription.  The Mesquiteers recognize that the murderer is one of the party in the room.  Keen on his detective magazine that he constantly carries with him, Stony and the Mesquiteers lead an expedition to find Professor Marsh, the lost city and its treasure and the murderer. Well-armed devil worshiping Indians and animate mummies enliven the proceedings.

Cast
Bob Livingston as Stony Brooke, Mesquiteer
Ray "Crash" Corrigan as Tucson Smith, Mesquiteer
Max Terhune as Lullaby Joslin, Mesquiteer
Mary Russell as Betty Marsh, daughter of the missing archeologist, Prof. Marsh
Roger Williams as Rutledge, another member of the expedition to find Prof.  Marsh
Fern Emmett as Henrietta McCoy
C. Montague Shaw as Prof. Flaxon
Yakima Canutt as Otah, an Indian guide travelling with the Mesquiteers
John Ward as Prof. Brewster
George Godfrey as Prof. Fronc
Earle Ross as Prof. Cleary
Frank Ellis as Coggins, the cook
Chief Thundercloud as High Priest
John Van Pelt as Prof. Marsh, an archeologist searching for a lost city in the American west

References

External links
 
 
 
 
 The Livingston-Corrigan-Terhune period of Three Mesquiteers films at B-Westerns

1937 films
1937 Western (genre) films
American Western (genre) fantasy films
American black-and-white films
Films based on American novels
Films based on Western (genre) novels
Films directed by Mack V. Wright
Films produced by Nat Levine
Republic Pictures films
Three Mesquiteers films
Treasure hunt films
1930s English-language films
1930s American films